D (D-flat) is a musical note lying a diatonic semitone above C and a chromatic semitone below D. It is thus enharmonic to C. In the French solfège it is known as re bémol. It is the second semitone of the solfège.

When calculated in equal temperament with a reference of A above middle C as 440 Hz, the frequency of middle D (or D4) is approximately 277.183 Hz. See pitch (music) for a discussion of historical variations in frequency.

Designation by octave

Scales

Common scales beginning on D
 D major: D E F G A B C D
 D natural minor: D E F G A B C D
 D harmonic minor: D E F G A B C D
 D melodic minor ascending: D E F G A B C D
 D melodic minor descending: D C B A G F E D

Diatonic scales
 D Ionian: D E F G A B C D
 D Dorian: D E F G A B C D
 D Phrygian: D E F G A B C D
 D Lydian: D E F G A B C D
 D Mixolydian: D E F G A B C D
 D Aeolian: D E F G A B C D
 D Locrian: D E F G A B C D

Jazz melodic minor
 D ascending melodic minor: D E F G A B C D
 D Dorian ♭2: D E F G A B C D
 D Lydian augmented: D E F G A B C D
 D Lydian dominant: D E F G A B C D
 D Mixolydian ♭6: D E F G A B C D
 D Locrian ♮2: D E F G A B C D
 D altered: D E F G A B C D

See also
 C♯ (musical note)
 Piano key frequencies
 D-flat major
 D-flat minor
 Root (chord)

Musical notes